Lei Huang Mendes (born 14 August 1982) is a Chinese-born Portuguese table tennis player. She competed for Portugal at the 2012 Summer Olympics.

Personal life
She is married to a Portuguese from Madeira who is also her coach.

References

Chinese emigrants to Portugal
Portuguese female table tennis players
Table tennis players at the 2012 Summer Olympics
Olympic table tennis players of Portugal
1982 births
Living people
Table tennis players from Sichuan
Naturalised citizens of Portugal
Chinese female table tennis players
Naturalised table tennis players

Portuguese people of Chinese descent